George Dwubeng (born 15 January 2000) is a Ghanaian footballer who currently plays for Al-Wasl.

Career statistics

Club

Notes

References

External links

2000 births
Living people
Ghanaian footballers
Association football defenders
UAE Pro League players
FC Politehnica Iași (2010) players
Al-Wasl F.C. players
Expatriate footballers in Romania
Ghanaian expatriate sportspeople in Romania
Expatriate footballers in the United Arab Emirates
Ghanaian expatriate sportspeople in the United Arab Emirates